Huling Patak ng Dugo (lit: Last Drop of Blood) is a 1950 Philippine drama film directed by Nardo Vercudia. It stars Pancho Magalona and Alicia Vergel with Bert Olivar, Rosa Mia, Jaime Castellvi, Chichay and Tolindoy, introducing Cesar Ramirez.

Cast
Pancho Magalona
Alicia Vergel
Chichay
Eddie Garcia
Cesar Ramirez
Tolindoy
Bert Olivar
Rosa Mia
Jaime Castellvi

References

External links

1950 films
Philippine action drama films
Sampaguita Pictures films
Philippine black-and-white films